Losing My Religion is the eleventh studio album from Kirk Franklin. RCA Inspiration a division of RCA Records alongside Fo Yo Soul Recordings released the album on November 13, 2015. It won the Grammy Award for Best Gospel Album in 2017.

Critical reception

Signaling in a ten out of ten review from Cross Rhythms, Tony Cummings called the album "a great comeback". Matt Conner, indicating in a four star review by CCM Magazine, stated "Losing My Religion is every bit the spirited, charismatic and powerful album you’d expect (and hope for) from the seven-time GRAMMY winner." Awarding the album five stars at New Release Today, Dwayne Lacy stated, "This is vintage Kirk!" Thom Jurek of AllMusic gave the album four out of five stars, praising the album for its message and concept saying "It's a rhyming, socio-political-spiritual manifesto, an admonition to evangelists that religion masks God's love and mercy; it's a barrier rather than a bridge."

Commercial performance
The album debuted at number 10 on the Billboard 200 with first-week sales of 35,000 copies.

Track listing

Personnel

Vocalists
Faith Anderson
Melodie Davis
Chelsea West
Michael Bethany
Amber Bullock
Caltomeesh "Candy" West
Crystal Aikin
Myron Butler
Niya Cotton
Anthony Evans
Nathan Myers
Shawlesa Amos
Darian Yancey
Joy Hill
James Henderson
Dalon Collins
Deonis Cook
Maurice Brown
Adrian Oneal
Patron Thomas
Shaun Martin
Deon Yancey
Darius Dixon
Elgin Johnson
Sydnii Raymore
Teaira Dunn
Emoni Wilkins
John Montes

Instrumentalists
Kirk Franklin – piano, keyboards
Shaun Martin – keyboards, piano
Keith Taylor – bass
Robert Searight – drums
Braylon Lacy – bass, upright bass
Mark Lettieri – lead guitar
Kermit Wells – Hammond B-3
Max Stark – programming
Philip Lassiter – trumpet, flugelhorn
Tyler Summers – tenor and baritone saxophone
Roy Agee – trombone and bass trombone

Charts

Weekly charts

Year-end charts

References

2015 albums
Kirk Franklin albums
RCA Records albums
Grammy Award for Best Gospel Album